Tulaya is a genus of moths of the family Crambidae. It was previously named Hercynella but that name was pre-occupied by a genus of fossil molluscs.

Species
Tulaya margelana (Bethune-Baker, 1893)
Tulaya staudingeri (Bethune-Baker, 1893)

References
 Özdikmen, H. 2007. New substitute names for three preoccupied lepidopteran genera: Hercynella Bethune-Baker, 1893, Coloneura Davis, 1964 and Paragorgopis Viette, 1951 (Lepidoptera). Munis Entomology & Zoology 1 (2): 115-118

Odontiinae
Crambidae genera